The huhu beetle (Prionoplus reticularis) is a longhorn beetle endemic to New Zealand. It is the heaviest beetle found in New Zealand.

Māori name
To Māori, the larval form is known as huhu (also tunga haere, tunga rākau) with the adult stage known as pepe-te-muimui. However, the larval and adult forms are commonly referred to as the huhu grub and huhu beetle, respectively.

As the huhu larva reaches maturity it ceases to bore in wood and casts its skin.

Life cycle

Female adult huhu beetles oviposit their 3mm cigar-shaped eggs in clutches of 10–50, though up to 100 may be found. Eggs are laid in cryptic sites or in cracks in the bark of fallen wood. In laboratory conditions of 20°C ± 2°C and a relative humidity of c. 75%, eggs hatched in 23 ± 2 days. 

Before hatching, the larva can be seen to move inside the egg and will break free from the egg using its mandibles to pierce the chorion of the egg and then enlarging the opening by chewing, although the chorion itself is not ingested. Setae that are found on abdominal segments 1-6 assist in providing support as the larva leaves the egg and excavates the initial gallery.

Larval duration of P. reticularis is two to three years in the wild. Under laboratory conditions, larval duration has been reduced to c. 250 days using an artificial diet and maintaining a temperature of 20°C. In its final instar the larva moves to within 7.5 - 10cm of the surface of the wood before constructing the pupal chamber. The pupal chamber is constructed by enlarging the diameter of the normal gallery over a period of one to three days. This process creates fragments of wood similar to wood shavings about 3cm by 1cm in size which are then packed into the larval gallery to form a plug. Once the plug is completed the larva lines the walls of the pupal chamber with the last frass voided from its gut. The larva then undergoes a resting period of around ten to fifteen days where the abdominal segments contract and the body darkens slightly whereupon it moults into a pupa. 

The pupal phase lasts around 25 days with gametogenesis being completed during this stage. Eclosion occurs with a rupture along the frontal suture followed by a longitudinal rupture to the posterior border of the mesothorax. The head, feet and wings are freed during arching movements of the body through the ruptured cuticle. The emerged adult may then enter an inactive period of three to five days prior to creating an exit tunnel out of the pupal cavity.

Following pupation and emergence, the adult beetle does not eat and lives for approximately two weeks.

Behaviour
The beetles are nocturnal and are attracted by the lights of dwellings as noted by Hudson in 1892 "it is greatly attracted to light, and this propensity frequently leads it on summer evenings to invade ladies' drawing-rooms, when its sudden and noisy arrival is apt to cause much needless consternation amongst the inmates". They have powerful mandibles, which can produce a painful bite. 

Adult females of P. reticularis produce an olfactory cue which attract adult males to the female. Adult individuals of both sexes will show a display behaviour if disturbed with the head jutting forward, mandibles opening to their full extent, antennae flailing and the head being raised and lowered. High intensity displays between individuals may lead to combat with preliminary grappling occurring with fore legs which usually results in an individual being thrown onto its back. Any object coming into contact with the mandibles is seized frequently resulting in the loss of appendages.

As food 
The larvae of P. reticularis are edible to humans, with a long history of indigenous consumption, and their flavour has been described as like buttery chicken or peanut butter. There are different names in Māori for grubs at different stages of development, for example young larvae still actively feeding on timber are called tunga haere or tunga rākau, while full grown grubs which have ceased to feed and are preparing to pupate are called tataka and are the most prized (because there is no undigested wood pulp inside of them at this point). Huhu grubs may be consumed either raw or traditionally cooked in a hāngi, and are an especially rich source of fat in the New Zealand wilderness.

P. reticularis contains substantial amounts of nutrients. The larvae and pupae are relatively high in fat (up to 45% and 58% dry weight in large larvae and pupae respectively). The fat in huhu grubs is mostly oleic acid and palmitic acid. The second most abundant nutrient is protein, which is present at 30% dry weight in the large larvae, and close to 28% dry weight in the pupae. Protein extracts from huhu larvae and pupae are high in essential amino acids such as isoleucine, lysine, leucine, and valine. The total essential amino acid content of huhu grubs meets the WHO essential amino acid requirements for human nutrition. The essential amino acid content of huhu is significantly higher than that of mealworms, and is comparable to beef and chickpeas. When reconstituted in water, the protein powders of huhu larvae and pupae are able to form stable foams and emulsions. The ash content (representing minerals) of huhu grubs is 1.8% dry weight in large larvae, and 2.2% in pupae. The minerals include manganese, magnesium, phosphorus, iron, copper, and zinc.

See also
 Witchetty grub

References

External links

 Landcare Research  - data
 Huhu beetle discussed on RNZ Critter of the Week, 29 November 2019

Prioninae
Beetles of New Zealand
Edible insects
Māori cuisine
Beetles and humans
Beetles described in 1843
Endemic fauna of New Zealand
Endemic insects of New Zealand